Vladimir Lvovich Turiyansky is a Russian poet, composer, and bard.

After studying for three years in the Moscow State Art and Cultural University, Turiyansky worked as a geologist, going on expeditions to Siberia. Turiyansky then became an electrical expert, where he calibrated geophysical apparatuses.

In 1959, Turiyansky began writing songs, primarily around his poems.

Turiyansky now lives in Moscow, Russia.

References

1935 births
Living people
Russian bards
Russian geologists
Russian guitarists
Russian male composers
Russian male musicians
Russian male poets
Russian male singer-songwriters
Russian male guitarists